The Sleep Room is a 1998 Canadian television movie about experiments on Canadian mental patients that were carried out in the 1950s and 1960s by Donald Ewen Cameron and funded by the CIA's MKUltra program. It originally aired as a miniseries and is based on the book In The Sleep Room: The Story of CIA Brainwashing Experiments in Canada  by Anne Collins.

The first half of the film details the evolution of Cameron's experiments using a procedure he called psychic driving which included continuous loop taped messages while the patients were under the influence of curare and LSD, as well as intensive electroshock treatments.  The second half covers the legal efforts  of the patients and their attorneys in the 1980s to obtain a settlement.  The film was directed by  Anne Wheeler and starred Leon Pownall, Macha Grenon, Nicola Cavendish,  Donald Moffat, Diego Matamoros, Jean-Guy Bouchard, Emmanuel Bilodeau and Marina Orsini.  It won several Gemini awards, including best television movie, best direction,  best performance, best sound, and outstanding special effects in make-up.

Plot
Dr. Ewen Cameron, as the head of the Allan Memorial Institute in Quebec, Canada, was interested in the repatterning of the brains of those with mental illnesses. He hypothesized that mental illness could be attributed to learning the wrong responses to situations. Cameron's study aimed to de-pattern the brain into an essentially infantile state, before re-patterning the brain to learn the correct responses to situations. The infantile state included a loss of the ability to speak, walk or control one's bowels and was generally irreversible. 

Cameron's primary method of de-patterning the brain was to place patients in a medically induced coma for several weeks at a time, while delivering powerful electric shocks used to further disorient the brain. This effectively wiped the minds and memories of many of his patients and is one of the greatest ethical dilemmas of this study.

References

External links

The Sleep Room at the Internet Movie Database
The Sleep Room on Youtube

1998 Canadian television series debuts
1998 Canadian television series endings
English-language Canadian films
1990s Canadian television miniseries
Films about the Central Intelligence Agency
Films about intellectual disability
Films about psychiatry
Films about lawyers
Gemini and Canadian Screen Award for Best Television Film or Miniseries winners
Works about Project MKUltra